Nelson is an unincorporated community in Mecklenburg County, Virginia, United States. Nelson has a post office with ZIP code 24580. Nelson is mostly a small farm community owned by the Nelson's.

References

Unincorporated communities in Mecklenburg County, Virginia
Unincorporated communities in Virginia